Boubout Dieng (born 19 November 1961) is a Mauritanian Olympic sprinter.

Dieng competed at the 1992 Summer Olympics held in Barcelona. He entered the 200 metres and he finished 7th in his heat in a time of 22.75 seconds but didn't advance to the next round.

References

1961 births
Living people
Olympic athletes of Mauritania
Mauritanian male sprinters
Athletes (track and field) at the 1992 Summer Olympics